Crauford is both a surname and a masculine given name. Notable people with the name include:

W. H. Lane Crauford (1884–1955), English writer
Crauford Kent (1881–1953), English-born American actor
Florence Crauford Grove (1838–1902), English mountain climber and writer

See also
Crauford baronets

Masculine given names